Jeju Baseball Stadium is a baseball stadium in Jeju, South Korea.  It is used mostly for baseball games and is the second home stadium of Nexen Heroes.

Baseball venues in South Korea
Kiwoom Heroes
Sports venues completed in 1984
1984 establishments in South Korea
20th-century architecture in South Korea